The 1996 German Open was a professional ranking snooker tournament that took place between 9 and 15 December 1996 at the Roberts Barracks in Osnabrück, Germany. It was the second edition of the event, with 16 players competing in the final stage. Ronnie O'Sullivan won the event, beating Alain Robidoux 9–7 in the final. It was Robidoux's only appearance in a ranking event final.

Summary
16 players competed in the final stage at the British military base at Osnabrück. Play was delayed for two hours on the opening day, after the heating system failed.

Ronnie O'Sullivan beat Stephen Hendry 5–2 in the quarter-finals and then beat Nigel Bond 6–1 in the semi-finals, including three century breaks. O'Sullivan met Alain Robidoux in the final, winning 9–7. O'Sullivan was 4–2 ahead before Robidoux made a break of 145 in frame 7, the highest-ever in a ranking event outside the United Kingdom. O'Sullivan led 5–3 after the first session and later extended his lead to 7–3 before Robidoux won the next four frames to level the match at 7–7. O'Sullivan then won the next two frames to win the match, finishing with a break of 108. O'Sullivan won £40,000 while Robidoux took the runners-up prize of £22,500 and the high break prize of £5,000.

Main draw

Qualifying
The final qualifying round was held in Preston, Lancashire in November 1997.

Final qualifying round

References

German Masters
1996 in snooker
1996 in German sport
Sport in Osnabrück